Demo 2012 is the debut album by Richmond, Virginia-based crossover thrash band Iron Reagan.

Track listing

Personnel
Iron Reagan
Tony Foresta – vocals
Mark Bronzino – guitar
Phil Hall – guitar
Paul Burnette – bass guitar
Ryan Parrish – drums

Production
Produced by Phil Hall
Mastered by Dan Randall
Artwork by Brandon Ferrell, Richard Minino

References

External links
Official website

2012 albums
Iron Reagan albums
Demo albums